Journey to the Stone Country is a 2002 Miles Franklin literary award-winning novel by the Australian author Alex Miller.

Background
Miller wrote Journey to the Stone Country in 18 months and three drafts. The two protagonists, Bo and Annabelle, were based on friends of his.

Though Miller originally envisioned the novel as a love story, the book soon grew into what The Age called "a national epic," addressing themes of reconciliation between indigenous Australians and white settlers.

Plot
Annabelle, a Melbourne academic, learns that her husband is leaving her for an honours student. She leaves for her family home in Townsville and takes a job with an archaeologist doing cultural surveys for mining permits. There she meets Bo Rennie, an Aboriginal stockman whom Annabelle had met during her childhood. Instantly attracted to one another, the two embark on a journey to rural Queensland to survey a dam.

Reception
The Sydney Morning Herald praised the novel and Miller's "meticulous, skilful writing.". The Curtin University of Technology's API Review of Books was less positive, calling the narrative "surprisingly disappointing" and some of the dialogue "uncharacteristically clumsy" for Miller. Critics and scholars were mixed on Miller's portrayal of Reconciliation, some claiming the book romanticized his indigenous characters, others citing the narrative's complexity.

Awards
Tasmania Pacific Region Prize, Tasmania Pacific Fiction Prize, 2005: shortlisted
State Library of Tasmania People's Choice Award, 2005: winner
Festival Awards for Literature (SA), Dymocks Booksellers Award for Fiction, 2004: shortlisted
One Book One Brisbane, 2004: shortlisted
New South Wales Premier's Literary Awards, Christina Stead Prize for Fiction, 2003: shortlisted
Miles Franklin Literary Award, 2003: winner
The Age Book of the Year Award, Fiction Prize, 2003: shortlisted
Colin Roderick Award, 2002: shortlisted

References

Novels by Alex Miller
2002 Australian novels
Miles Franklin Award-winning works
Novels set in Queensland